Romauro Ron Perry (born December 20, 1963) is an American football tight end who played one season with the Los Angeles Raiders.

References

1963 births
American football tight ends
Living people
Los Angeles Raiders players
Ole Miss Rebels football players
Players of American football from Chicago